Metagenes was an Athenian comic poet of the Old Comedy, contemporary with Aristophanes, Phrynichus, and Plato. The Suda gives the following titles of his plays: Αὖραι, Μαμμάκυθος, Θουριοπέρσαι, Φιλοθύτης, Ὅμηρος ἢ Ἀσκηταί, some of which appear to be corrupt.

References

4th-century BC Athenians
4th-century BC writers
5th-century BC Athenians
5th-century BC writers
Ancient Athenians
Ancient Greek dramatists and playwrights
Old Comic poets